is a private junior college in Bunkyō, Tokyo, Japan.

It was set up as a women's junior college in 1963, and became coeducational in 2006. After a new schoolhouse had been built to Ōi, Saitama (at present Fujimino, Saitama), it became three systems of the subject in 1982. It became a single department junior college again in April 1997.

Department and Graduate Course

Departments 
 Department of English

Advanced course 
 No

Available certifications 
 Second class License for junior high school teacher (subject: English) was put as a teacher-training before.

Access
The Hongō campus is located just up the street from the University of Tokyo. It is directly outside Exit #2 of Tōdaimae Station on the Tokyo Metro Namboku Line. It is about a 10-minute walk from Hakusan Station on the Toei Mita Line and about a 10-minute walk from Nezu Station on the Tokyo Metro Chiyoda Line.

See also 
 List of junior colleges in Japan

External links
 Bunkyo Gakuin College 

Private universities and colleges in Japan
Japanese junior colleges
Universities and colleges in Tokyo